Tollywood films of 1940s may refer to:

 Bengali films of the 1940s
 Telugu films of the 1940s